HMS Anacreon had an extremely brief career. She was commissioned in early 1813 and was lost within a year.

Career
Commander John Davies supposedly commissioned her in May 1813, but she had apparently already been in service by then. On 9 April 1813 Eleanor Wilhelmina arrived at Yarmouth, Anacreon having detained her as she was sailing from North Bergen. Davies then sailed Anacreon for Lisbon on 3 August.

On 1 February 1814 she recaptured the Spanish ship Nostra Senora del Carmen la Sirena. Late in January the French privateer Lion had captured three ships in all and plundered two, which she had permitted to go on to Lisbon. Anacreon had recaptured the third, Nostra Senora..., and then had set off in pursuit of the privateer.

Loss
Anacreon was last sighted on 28 February 1814 in the English Channel as she was returning from Lisbon. Soon thereafter, she disappeared without trace in a storm. All aboard were lost.

See also
List of people who disappeared mysteriously at sea

Notes

Citations

References
 
 

1810s missing person cases
1813 ships
Maritime incidents in 1814
Missing ships
People lost at sea
Shipwrecks in the English Channel
Sloops of the Royal Navy
Warships lost with all hands